The 2008 Los Angeles Avengers season was the ninth and final season for the franchise. The Avengers finished the season with a 5–11 record, and failed to make the playoffs.  Two days after the final regular season game, head coach Ed Hodgkiss and two assistants were fired from the team. Also, the team folded 10 months later.

Standings

Regular season schedule

Staff

Roster

Stats

Regular season

Week 1: vs. New Orleans VooDoo

Week 2: at Arizona Rattlers

Week 3: at Georgia Force

Week 4: vs. Philadelphia Soul

Week 5: at Grand Rapids Rampage

Week 6: at Colorado Crush

Week 7: vs. Utah Blaze

Week 8: vs. Cleveland Gladiators

Week 9: at San Jose SaberCats

Week 10: vs. Arizona Rattlers

Week 11: vs. New York Dragons

Week 12: at Chicago Rush

Week 13
Bye Week

Week 14: vs. San Jose SaberCats

Week 15: at Utah Blaze

Week 16: vs. Kansas City Brigade

Week 17: at Tampa Bay Storm

References

Los Angeles Avengers
Los Angeles Avengers seasons